Strathkelvin is the strath (valley) of the River Kelvin in west central Scotland, lying north-east of Glasgow. The name Strathkelvin was used between 1975 and 1996 for one of nineteen local government districts in the Strathclyde region.

History
The district was created in 1975 under the Local Government (Scotland) Act 1973, which established a two-tier structure of local government across mainland Scotland comprising upper-tier regions and lower-tier districts. Strathkelvin was one of nineteen districts created within the region of Strathclyde. The district covered parts of five former districts from the historic counties of Dunbartonshire, Lanarkshire, and Stirlingshire, all of which were abolished at the same time:
From Dunbartonshire
Kirkintilloch Burgh
Kirkintilloch and Cumbernauld District: the landward (outside a burgh) part of the parish of Kirkintilloch, excluding the parts within the designated area for Cumbernauld New Town
From Lanarkshire
Bishopbriggs Burgh
Ninth District: the Chryston and Stepps electoral divisions
From Stirlingshire
Western No. 3 District, being the parishes of Baldernock and Campsie

The 1973 Act named the new district "Bishopbriggs and Kirkintilloch". The shadow council elected in 1974 to oversee the transition to the new system requested a change of name to "Strathkelvin", referring to the area's location in the valley or strath of the River Kelvin. The change of name was approved by the government before the new district came into being.

The district was abolished in 1996 under the Local Government etc. (Scotland) Act 1994 which replaced regions and districts with unitary council areas. Most of Strathkelvin went to the East Dunbartonshire council area, but the Chryston and Auchinloch area went instead to North Lanarkshire.

The Strathkelvin name is still used in the judicial sheriffdom of "Glasgow and Strathkelvin".

Political control
The first election to the district council was held in 1974, initially operating as a shadow authority alongside the outgoing authorities until it came into its powers on 16 May 1975. Political control of the council from 1975 was as follows:

Leadership
Full council meetings were chaired by the provost. For the council's first couple of years the provost also provided political leadership, chairing the policy and resources and committee. From 1977 onwards the council appointed a separate leader of the council to provide political leadership, with the role of provost thereafter being more ceremonial. The leaders were:

The last leader of the council, Charles Kennedy, went on to be the first leader of the successor East Dunbartonshire Council.

Elections
Elections were held as follows:

Premises
The council was initially based at several offices across the district. In 1985 it built a new headquarters at the junction of Lenzie Road and Civic Way in Kirkintilloch. The building was called Tom Johnston House, named after Tom Johnston (1881–1965), who was born in Kirkintilloch and had served as Secretary of State for Scotland during the Second World War. After the council's abolition in 1996, Tom Johnston House served as the headquarters of the successor East Dunbartonshire Council until 2012, and has subsequently been demolished.

See also
Subdivisions of Scotland

References

Districts of Scotland
Politics of East Dunbartonshire
Bishopbriggs
Kirkintilloch